Karl Kirchwey (born February 25, 1956) is an American poet, essayist, translator, critic, teacher, arts administrator, and literary curator. His career has taken place both inside and outside of academia. He is currently Professor of English and Creative Writing at Boston University, where he teaches in the MFA Program in Creative Writing and in the MFA degree program in Literary Translation. His published work includes seven books of poems, two poetry anthologies, and a translation of French poet Paul Verlaine’s first book of poems.

Early life and education 
Kirchwey was born in Boston, Massachusetts to Ellen Douglas (née Allen) and George W. Kirchwey, an executive for a multinational company. His family moved frequently during his childhood, including periods in Massachusetts, California, Connecticut, Quebec (Canada), London (U.K.) and Lausanne (Switzerland). He attended high school at Aiglon College (Switzerland) and Phillips Academy (Massachusetts). He received a B.A. from Yale College, where he was a student of John Hollander, J.D. McClatchy and Penelope Laurans, and an M.A. in English Literature from Columbia University.

Personal life 
Kirchwey married Tamzen Flanders in 1988. They have two adult children.

Career 
Kirchwey has taught at the secondary school level at the American School in Switzerland (TASIS) and Elizabeth Irwin High School (New York City). At the college level, he has taught at Smith College, Wesleyan, Yale and Columbia Universities and at Bryn Mawr College, where he served as Director of Creative Writing (2000-2010). Since 2014, he has been Professor of English and Creative Writing at Boston University, where he teaches in the MFA Program in Creative Writing and in the MFA degree program in Literary Translation. His career as an arts administrator and literary curator has included service as the Director of the Unterberg Poetry Center of the 92nd Street YM-YWHA in New York (1987-2000) and the Andrew Heiskell Arts Director at the American Academy in Rome (2010-13). At the college and university level, he has taught in and directed the Creative Writing Program at Bryn Mawr College (2000-10), directed the MFA Program in Creative Writing at Boston University (2014-16), and served as Associate Dean of Faculty for the Humanities in the College of Arts & Sciences at Boston University (2017-22).

Literary work  
From the beginning, Kirchwey’s work has been distinguished by its geographical and temporal range, with settings in Europe and North America, both in the worlds of ancient Greece and Rome and of the contemporary United States. In a comment on Kirchwey’s third book, poet and critic John Hollander asserted that Kirchwey "has become even more profoundly the elegiac poet of places and sited moments, more than merely skillful and interpretively adroit".

Kirchwey’s first magazine publications as a poet included The New Yorker, The New Republic, The Yale Review, Prairie Schooner, The Paris Review, Shenandoah, The Southwest Review, The Massachusetts Review, The Nation, and The New Criterion. These poems were gathered in his first book, A Wandering Island (1990), which received the Norma Farber First Book Award from the Poetry Society of America.

His third book, The Engrafted Word (1998), included work arising from a Rome Prize and a Guggenheim Fellowship year spent in the city of Rome with his family, and was designated a “Notable Book of the Year” by The New York Times.

His fifth book, The Happiness of This World: Poetry and Prose (2007) resulted from a trip to Saipan (Northern Marianas Islands), Cambodia, and India, and included an extended hybrid essay in poetry and prose entitled “A Yatra  for Yama.” A second book of Roman poems, Stumbling Blocks, followed in 2017. This book took its title from the Holocaust memorial art project by German artist Gunter Demnig. 

Throughout his career, Kirchwey has occasionally translated poetry, primarily from French and Italian. His translation of poet Paul Verlaine’s first book appeared in 2011 as Poems Under Saturn, and he has been working on a volume of translations entitled More Honor in Betrayal: Selected Poems 1965-1984 by Italian poet Giovanni Giudici (1924-2011).

While working at the American Academy in Rome, Kirchwey prepared literary walking itineraries, and these gave rise to his first anthology, Roman Poems, gathering mostly English-language poems about the Eternal City from the Renaissance to the present. His second anthology, Poems of Healing, was begun before the COVID pandemic. His own work has been widely anthologized, including four times in The Best American Poetry (1991, 1995, 1998, 2018), and in The Best of the Best American Poetry, 1987-1998.

Kirchwey’s essays and reviews have appeared in Literary Imagination, The New York Times Book Review, Parnassus: Poetry in Review, The Philadelphia Inquirer, Provincetown Arts, Slate, Stagebill (New York City Opera), and elsewhere. Several of a set of linked hybrid essays (memoir, poetry, history, family correspondence) concerning ambiguous loss and the legacy of World War II have appeared or are forthcoming in Arion, AGNI, The American Scholar, and Raritan.

Kirchwey’s long poem-in-progress is called Mutabor, and portions of it have been published in journals including Little Star, Arion, AGNI, The Antioch Review, Literary Imagination, The Yale Review, and Raritan. He has also written a verse drama entitled Airedales & Cipher, an adaptation of the Alcestis of Euripides.

Bibliography

Poetry
Stumbling Blocks: Roman Poems,TriQuarterly Books/Northwestern University Press, 2017
Mount Lebanon (poems), Marian Wood Books/G.P. Putnam’s Sons, 2011
The Happiness of This World: Poems and Prose, Marian Wood Books/G.P. Putnam’s Sons, 2007
At the Palace of Jove (poems), Marian Wood Books/ G.P. Putnam’s Sons, 2002
The Engrafted Word (poems), Henry Holt and Company, 1998 (New York Times “Notable Book of the Year”)
Those I Guard (poems), Harcourt, Brace and Company, 1993
A Wandering Island (poems), Princeton University Press, 1990

Translation
Poems Under Saturn, a translation of Paul Verlaine’s Poèmes saturniens (1866), Princeton University Press, 2011

Anthologies (edited)
Poems of Healing (edited), an anthology of world poems from antiquity to the present, Everyman’s Library, 2021
Poems of Rome (edited), an anthology of poems from the Renaissance to the present, Everyman’s Library, 2018

Honors and awards
Cato Prize for Poetry (awarded by the Classics Conclave), 2015
Rosalyn R. Schwartz Teaching Award, Bryn Mawr College, 2003
The Engrafted Word named a “Notable Book of the Year” by The New York Times, 1998
The Paris Review Prize for Poetic Drama, 1997
National Endowment for the Arts Literature Fellowship (Poetry), 1996
John Simon Guggenheim Memorial Foundation Fellowship (Poetry), 1994
Rome Prize Fellowship (American Academy in Rome), 1994
Ingram Merrill Foundation Fellowship, 1993
Norma Farber First Book Award (Poetry Society of America), 1991

References

External links
 American Academy in Rome website
 Karl Kirchwey page at Bryn Mawr website
 

1956 births
Living people
American male poets
Yale College alumni
Columbia Graduate School of Arts and Sciences alumni
Phillips Academy alumni
The New Yorker people
20th-century American poets
20th-century American male writers
21st-century American poets
21st-century American male writers
Alumni of Aiglon College